Macau does not have formal political parties. However, some civic groups representing the interests of business, labor, and social welfare put forward lists at the elections. The following is a listing of associations that participated in the most recent legislative elections:

 Union for Development
 United Citizens Association of Macau
 Union for Promoting Progress
 Macau-Guangdong Union
 Por Macau
 Alliance for Change
 New Union for Macau's Development
 Macau Business Interest Union(OMKC, also known as Macau union of employer's interests)
 Employees Association Joint Candidature Commission(CCCAE)
 Macau professional Interest Union(OMCY)
 Association for Promotion of Social Services and Education
 Excellent Culture and Sports Union Association
 New Macau Association
 New Democratic Macau Association
 Prosperous Democratic Macau Association
 New Macau Liberals
 New Hope
 Civil Watch(Civico)
 Association for Together Efforts to Improve the Community(MAC)
 Activism for Democracy Association
 Democratic Society Alliance
 Association for Promotion of Civic Rights(APDC)
 Macau Ideals
 Innovative Action
 Supervision by the Lower Class
 Workers' Movement Front(MO)

Defunct associations
 Plural Voices – Peoples of Macau
 Association for Democracy and Social Well-Being of Macau
 Vision Macau
 Convergence for Development
 New Youth of Macau
 General Union for the Good of Macau
 Association for Promoting the Economy of Macau
 Employees and Wage-Earners Association
 General Union for Development of Macau

See also
 Politics of Macau
 List of political parties by country
List of political parties in the Republic of China before and after 1949
List of political parties in mainland China
List of political parties in Hong Kong

Macau
 
Politics of Macau
Political parties
Macau

Political parties